Lorain Francis Enoch Chamberlain Thorne (December 4, 1880 – ?) was an American college football coach.

Early years
Thorne was born in December 1880 in Michigan. His father, William Thorne, was a grocer in Ypsilanti, Michigan.

Michigan State Normal School
Thorne was the head football coach at Michigan State Normal School—now known as Eastern Michigan University—in Ypsilanti, Michigan for the 1898 season.  His coaching record at the school was 1–5–2.

Head coaching record

Later years
At the time of the U.S. Census of 1900, Thorne was living with his parents in Ypsilanti and working in a woolen mill.

In a September 1918 draft registration card, Thorne was living in Port Huron, Michigan, and identified his present occupation as manufacturer and his employment status as "not employed."  He was married at the time to Maude A. Thorne.

At the time of the 1920 U.S. Census, he was living in Port Huron with his wife Maude and daughter Charlotte.  His occupation was listed as a grocery store merchant.

References

1880 births
Year of death missing
Eastern Michigan Eagles football coaches